Da-Palm Senior Secondary School is a rural school in Otjimbingwe in the Erongo Region of central Namibia.  the sixth best school in Erongo Region.

Situated on the banks of the ephemeral Swakop River, Da-Palm is a government boarding school that was established in 1982. It teaches pupils from grade 8 to 12, and has 480 learners.

See also
 Education in Namibia
 List of schools in Namibia

References

Schools in Erongo Region
1982 establishments in South West Africa
Otjimbingwe